The 1920 Washington Sun Dodgers football team represented the University of Washington during the 1920 college football season. Home games were played on campus in Seattle at Denny Field and the new Husky Stadium.

In its first season under coach Stub Allison, the team compiled a 1–5 record, finished in last place in the Pacific Coast Conference, and was outscored by its opponents by a combined total of 83 to 54.  Ted Faulk was the team captain.

The final game at Denny Field was a 3–0 loss to Stanford on Saturday, November 6. The venue later known as Husky Stadium was opened for the season's concluding game, a 28–7 homecoming loss to Dartmouth on November 27.

Schedule

References

Washington
Washington Huskies football seasons
Washington Sun Dodgers football